Lell is a surname. Notable people with the surname include:

Alari Lell (born 1976), Estonian footballer
Christian Lell (born 1984), German footballer
Eduardo Lell (born 1964), Argentine footballer

See also
Lall

Estonian-language surnames